Putlur Railway Station is one of the railway stations of the Chennai Central–Arakkonam section of the Chennai Suburban Railway Network. It serves the neighbourhood of Putlur, a suburb of Chennai, and is located 39 km west of Chennai Central railway station. It has an elevation of 44 m above sea level.

Putlur is a halt station and not a full-fledged one.

History
The lines at the station were electrified on 29 November 1979, with the electrification of the Chennai Central–Tiruvallur section.

See also

 Chennai Suburban Railway

References

External links
 Putlur halt station at Indiarailinfo.com

Stations of Chennai Suburban Railway
Railway stations in Tiruvallur district